The 2014 Houston Cougars baseball team represented the University of Houston in the 2014 intercollegiate baseball season. Houston competed in Division I of the National Collegiate Athletic Association (NCAA) in its inaugural season as a member of the American Athletic Conference. The Cougars played home games at Cougar Field on the university's campus in Houston, Texas. Fourth-year head coach Todd Whitting, a former second baseman for the team during the 1992, 1994, and 1995 seasons and an assistant coach with the Cougars from 1996 through 2003, led the Cougars.

Upon winning the inaugural American Athletic Conference tournament, Houston entered the 2014 NCAA Division I baseball tournament for the nineteenth time in school history.  In the Baton Rouge Regional, they defeated LSU to advance to the super regional round for the first time since 2003, and the fourth time in school history.

Personnel

Coaches

Players

Schedule

Ranking movements

Awards and honors 
Caleb Barker
Baton Rouge All-Regional Team
First Team All-American Conference (C)
American Weekly Honor Roll (March 17)
Johnny Bench Award Watch List

Tyler Ford
ABCA/Rawlings Second Team All-Central Region (RP)
MVP: All-Silver Glove Series vs. Rice
American Weekly Honor Roll (March 31)
College Baseball 360 Primetime Performer (Feb. 27)
American Pitcher of the Week (Feb. 24)

Aaron Garza
Second Team All-American Conference (RHP)
Gregg Olson Award Watch List
USA Baseball Golden Spikes Midseason Award Watch List
American Weekly Honor Roll (March 10)
Houston College Classic MVP
American Pitcher of the Week (March 3)
American Weekly Honor Roll (Feb. 17)

Casey Grayson
ABCA/Rawlings First Team All-Central Region (1B)
American Championship All-Tournament Team
Second Team All-American Conference (1B)
All-Silver Glove Series vs. Rice
All-Tournament Team Houston College Classic (1B)
American Player of the Week (April 21)
American Weekly Honor Roll (May 5)

Connor Hollis
Third Team All-American Conference (3B)
All-Silver Glove Series vs. Rice

Andrew Lantrip
Louisville Slugger Freshman All-American
American Championship All-Tournament Team
American Rookie of the Year
American Weekly Honor Roll (May 12)

Jake Lemoine
Premier Player of College Baseball Winner
Second Team All-American Conference
USA Baseball Collegiate National Team (Summer '14) Invitee
American Weekly Honor Roll (April 7)

Jacob Lueneburg
All-Silver Glove Series vs. Rice
All-Tournament Team Houston College Classic (DH)

Justin Montemayor
CollegeSportsMadness Preseason All-American Athletic Conference First Team
Perfect Game Preseason All-American Athletic Conference Team
Preseason All-American Athletic Conference Team
American Weekly Honor Roll (April 28)
CoSIDA Academic All-District
First Team All-American Conference (DH)

Michael Pyeatt
Perfect Game Preseason All-American Athletic Conference Team
All-Silver Glove Series vs. Rice

Frankie Ratcliff
Perfect Game Preseason All-American Athletic Conference Team
CollegeSportsMadness Preseason All-American Athletic Conference Second Team
American Player of the Week (March 10)
American Weekly Honor Roll (April 7)
All-Silver Glove Series vs. Rice

Jared Robinson
All-Silver Glove Series vs. Rice
Baton Rouge All-Regional Team

Kyle Survance
Baton Rouge Regional Most Outstanding Player
Baton Rouge All-Regional Team
American Championship All-Tournament Team
Second Team All-American Conference (OF)
All-Silver Glove Series vs. Rice
All-Tournament Team Houston College Classic (OF)
CollegeSportsMadness Preseason All-American Athletic Conference Second Team

Josh Vidales
American Championship All-Tournament Team
American Championship Most Outstanding Player

Chase Wellbrock
CollegeSportsMadness Preseason All-American Athletic Conference Second Team
NCBWA Stopper of the Year Watch List
Houston Male Cougar of the Year
Second Team All-American Conference (RHP)
ABCA/Rawlings First Team All-Central Region (RP)

Jared West
American Weekly Honor Roll (March 24)
American Pitcher of the Week (Feb. 17)

Cougars in the 2014 MLB Draft
The following members of the Houston Cougar baseball program were drafted in the 2014 Major League Baseball Draft.

Notes

References

External links
 

Houston Cougars baseball seasons
Houston
Houston
Houston